Max Bruch's Romance for Violin and Orchestra in A minor, Op. 42, was composed in 1874. Bruch had intended the piece to form the first movement of a projected second violin concerto. However the composer found himself unable to progress beyond the first movement and chose to publish the work as a standalone concert piece dedicated to violinist Robert Heckmann who along with Joseph Joachim had assisted Bruch with the violin part.

Background

Bruch started work on what he had planned to be his second violin concerto while preparing to conduct his choral work Odysseus: Szenen aus der Odyssee, Op. 41 in Cologne, by the 11th of February he had completed the first movement and indicated to friends that he had beginnings of the projected second and third movements. However, perhaps due to personal issues, most notably a relationship with Amalie Heydweiller, which Christopher Fitfield speculates may have been the inspiration for the completed movement, Bruch found himself unable to complete the remaining movements. His decision to publish the work as a single movement concert piece, was based in part on the positive reception of his friends to the completed movement.

Instrumentation

The composition is scored for solo violin and an orchestra comprising strings, 2 flutes, 2 oboes, 2 clarinets, 2 bassoons, 2 trumpets, 4 horns and timpani.

Structure

The composition consists of a single movement marked Andante sostenuto and typical performances last between 10 and 12 minutes.

References
Notes

Sources

External links
 
 
 

Compositions by Max Bruch
Compositions for violin and orchestra
1874 compositions
Compositions in A minor
Romance (music)